is a former Japanese football player.

Club statistics

References

External links

1981 births
Living people
Osaka University of Commerce alumni
Association football people from Ibaraki Prefecture
Japanese footballers
J2 League players
Ventforet Kofu players
Mito HollyHock players
Iwate Grulla Morioka players
Association football defenders